The Mother Cummings Peak is one of the prominent peaks on the Great Western Tiers located in the Central Highlands region of Tasmania, Australia.

The summit can be reached in about 1 – 2 hours (depending on fitness), and the track is rather steep. Two walking tracks lead to the summit: one from the north via Mole Creek, and the other from the south from the upper Meander Valley.

See also

 List of mountains in Tasmania

References

Mountains of Tasmania
Central Highlands (Tasmania)